Milan Dolinský (born 17 April 1935) is a former Slovak footballer. He played for CH Bratislava where he earned 10 caps and scored 5 goals for the Czechoslovakia national football team from 1959 to 1960, and participated in the 1960 European Nations' Cup.

Honours

Clubs
TJ Červená Hviezda Bratislava
 Czechoslovak First League: 1958–59
 International Football Cup: 1962–63, 1963–64
 Mitropa Cup: 1968–69

External links
Profile

1935 births
Slovak footballers
Czechoslovak footballers
Czechoslovakia international footballers
1960 European Nations' Cup players
FK Inter Bratislava players
Living people
Association football forwards